Lenche Ilkova (born ; October 4, 1984) is a Macedonian female handball player for Yenimahalle Bld. SK and the Macedonian national team.

She played for RK Mladost (2002–2003), urostandard GP Skopje (2003–2006), Kometal Gjorče Petrov Skopje (2007–2009) in her country before she moved in 2010 to Antalya, Turkey to join Muratpaşa Bld. SK in the Turkish Women's Handball Super League, where she was for one season. After playing two seasons with Üsküdar Belediyespor in Istanbul (2011–2013), she transferred to the Ankara-based Yenimahalle Bld. SK.

References

1984 births
Living people
Sportspeople from Strumica
Macedonian female handball players
Expatriate handball players in Turkey
Macedonian expatriate sportspeople in Turkey
Muratpaşa Bld. SK (women's handball) players
Üsküdar Belediyespor players
Yenimahalle Bld. SK (women's handball) players